Tanja Belamarić (born 16 July 1946) is a Croatian chess player who holds the FIDE title of Woman International Master (WIM, 1967).

From the early 1970s to the early 1990s Belamarić was one of the leading Croatian women's chess players. In 1967, she was awarded the FIDE Woman International Master (WIM) title. In 1971, Belamarić participated at the Women's World Chess Championship Interzonal Tournament in Ohrid and shared an 11th-12th place. 

She played for Croatia in the Women's Chess Olympiads:
 In 1992, at first reserve board in the 30th Chess Olympiad (women) in Manila (+4, =5, -2),
 In 1994, at first reserve board in the 31st Chess Olympiad (women) in Moscow (+2, =5, -0).

Belamarić played for Croatia in the European Team Chess Championship:
 In 1992, at second board in the 1st European Team Chess Championship (women) in Debrecen (+2, =2, -2).

References

External links
 
 
 

1946 births
Living people
Croatian female chess players
Yugoslav female chess players
Chess Woman International Masters